The 1988 United States presidential election in Rhode Island took place on November 8, 1988, as part of the 1988 United States presidential election, which was held throughout all 50 states and D.C. Voters chose four representatives, or electors to the Electoral College, who voted for president and vice president.

Rhode Island voted for the Democratic nominee, Massachusetts Governor Michael Dukakis, over Republican Vice President George H. W. Bush. Dukakis took 55.64% of the vote to Bush's 43.93%, a margin of 11.71%. This made it one of 10 states (plus the District of Columbia) to vote for Dukakis, while Bush won a convincing electoral victory nationwide.

A liberal New England state, Rhode Island gave Dukakis his strongest state victory in the nation, with only the District of Columbia voting more Democratic. It was one of just two states (along with Iowa) to vote Democratic by a double-digit margin, and one of only two states (along with Hawaii) to have all of its counties go to Dukakis. Despite this, it was still a relatively strong Republican performance compared to how the state has trended since. The state has voted Democratic in every presidential election that followed. This remains the last time a Republican candidate won over 40% of the vote in Rhode Island.

As of 2020, this was the last presidential election in which the towns of Barrington, Charlestown, Little Compton, Middletown, North Kingstown, and Portsmouth voted for the Republican candidate.

Results

By county

See also
 United States presidential elections in Rhode Island
 Presidency of George H. W. Bush

References

Rhode Island
1988
1988 Rhode Island elections